The Cheyenne National Cemetery is a cemetery in Cheyenne, Wyoming. It is the first and only national cemetery in Wyoming. It was dedicated by the United States Department of Veterans Affairs on October 8, 2020.

References

External links
 
 

2020 in Wyoming
Buildings and structures in Cheyenne, Wyoming
Cemeteries in Wyoming
United States national cemeteries